Bonamana (literally: Beauty) is the fourth studio album by South Korean boy band Super Junior. It is the first album with ten out of the original 13 members to take part, also marking the first album not to feature all active members. It was first released as Version A, on May 13, 2010, by SM Entertainment. This was followed by Version B on May 20, which included behind-the-scenes photos from their stage performances and music video shoots. A repackaged version C was released on June 28, with four new tracks including follow-up single "No Other".

The album was listed by Gaon Album Chart as the best-selling release of 2010 in South Korea, with 200,193 copies sold, with the repackaged version at ninth with 99,355 copies. Taken together, these sales made Bonamana the second best-selling album of the year, behind the combined total of 334,785 copies sold of Girls' Generation's Oh! and its repackage.

Recording and production
The group first announced that they were working on their fourth full-length studio album in January 2010 while presenting an award at Thailand's KPN Awards. A week later, Kibum, who participated very little in the group's third studio album Sorry, Sorry due to acting pursuits, discussed the possibility of participating in the production of Bonamana during an interview. After a thorough discussion with producers, Kibum decided to continue his acting career instead. With Kang-in fulfilling his two-year mandatory military service and Han Geng's lawsuit against SM Entertainment, only ten members were able to work on the album.

Shindong tweeted about preparing for the fourth album in early April. On April 19, SM Entertainment formally announced through online media outlets about the release and production of the album. After Super Junior finished their Super Show 2 Asia concert tour in the Philippines, the members postponed solo activities to fit more time on working in the album in time for a mid-May release.

Composition
Super Junior consistently described the main concept style of Bonamana to be "mature" and "sophisticated". Following the music genre that they settled for in Sorry, Sorry, the music in Bonamana is largely mainstream and is composed of a variety of genres including R&B ballads, pop dances, and hip hop. However, unlike Sorry, Sorry, a majority of Bonamana maintains a handful of cheerful, medium-tempo pop songs that Super Junior had been known for performing since debut.

The album contains 11 tracks with title track "Bonamana", an upbeat electropop song. SM described that "Bonamana" is the "completion of the SJ Funky genre", a genre that Super Junior will pursue continuously since its development in Sorry, Sorry. Eunhyuk created the dance choreography for "Boom Boom," hip hop dance track characterized for its "dark and powerful groove." Super Junior invites Park Chang-hyun a fourth time to write the soft vocal ballad "Coagulation", performed by Super Junior-K.R.Y. Similar to "Coagulation" is "One Fine Spring Day", a solo song by Ryeowook. The fourth track, "Your Eyes" is described as a "regular Super Junior R&B ballad", with emphasized characterization on the differences between Yesung's and Kyuhyun's voices. Surprisingly, on the seventh track "Shake It Up," Han Geng who was currently in a lawsuit with SM Entertainment, did not have his vocals scratched out on the track. It was revealed later by the representative of SM Entertainment that this song was recorded before Han Geng filed the lawsuit. The album ends with the cheerful electropop song "Here We Go" that will "[refresh] the listeners' hearings."

For the repackaged album, Bonamana Version C, there are four new songs. The first one, "No Other," received great feedback, so it was followed up with a music video released on July 7, 2010. The next song, "All My Heart" is written by Leeteuk and Henry Lau, is an acoustic guitar ballad. The other Super Junior member, Eunhyuk and Donghae also wrote and compose the song "A Short Journey" as a tribute for fellow member Kangin who was serving in the military. This song is performed mainly by Kangin, accompanied by Donghae, Yesung, Kyuhyun, and Ryeowook.

Singles
Like most of Super Junior's past lead singles, the first track was announced on May 6, 2010, as title track "Bonamana". A music video teaser, was released on May 7, with a brief and blurred preview of the song's chorus, and available for digital download from May 10. The full MV was released on May 12. Naming the genre as "SJ Funky" (Super Junior Funky), "Bonamana" consists of "African rhythms, with catchy grooves and club house beats." The song is widely defined to be in an electropop funk style, and a majority of the song is concentrated on vocals. It won multiple music program awards.

The follow-up single "No Other", digitally released on June 25, is a dance-pop track. It was produced by New York-based producers Reefa, Denzil (DR) Remedios, Kibwe (12Keyz) Luke and Ryan Jhun, who have worked with other hip-hop artists such as Fabolous, Ludacris and The Game.

Commercial performance
Over 200,000 copies were pre-ordered a week after the release date was announced, setting a new high record for the group. According to South Korea's Hanteo chart, version A of Bonamana, debuted at #1 on the charts, selling over 36,000 copies on the first day of release, making it the biggest opening day of the group's career. After four more days of release, over 70,000 copies were sold. Bonamana charted at #1 again on real time and daily charts after the release of version B, selling over 13,000 copies, totaling the offline sales to over 100,000.

The album peaked at number one on the Gaon Weekly Album Chart for the week of May 9 to 15, 2010 and also number one for May and June on the  Gaon Monthly Album Chart. In February 2011, according to Gaon Chart's 2010 year-end summation chart, the album's A and B versions sold a cumulative total of 200,193 copies, awarding the album as the "best selling album of 2010". Meanwhile, the repackaged album sold 99,355 copies, ranking at the ninth spot in the same chart, bringing to a total of almost 300,000 units sold in South Korea. While in Taiwan, the album sold a cumulative total of 57,000 copies. In the Philippines, the album reached gold status after a week released on May 4 selling 7,500 copies.

Promotion and live performances 
Super Junior's first comeback performance was on May 14 with the performance of "Boom Boom" and "Bonamana" on KBS2TV's Music Bank,. The group performed again with the roster the following weekend on MBC's Show! Music Core on May 15 and on SBS's The Music Trend on May 16.

Super Show 3 
Super Show 3 is Super Junior's third Asia-wide concert tour; it commenced with two shows in Seoul in August 2010 and continued onto China, Taiwan, Japan and other Asian countries, with a total of 20 concerts in 13 cities. On February 24, 2011, a 3D film of the Seoul concert was released in 16 CJ CGV cinemas. In October 2011, a live album of the concert held in Seoul was released.

Track listing

Charts

Weekly charts

Monthly charts

Yearly charts

Sales and certifications

Accolades

Release history

See also
 Bonamana
 
 
 
 
 No Other

References

External links
 Super Junior official homepage 

2010 albums
Super Junior albums
SM Entertainment albums
Avex Taiwan albums
Korean-language albums